Dunira punctimargo is a moth of the family Noctuidae first described by George Hampson in 1893. It is found in Sri Lanka and Taiwan.

References

External links
Images of Dunira punctimargo at the Taiwan Moth Information Center

Moths of Asia
Moths described in 1893